The ISPS Handa Championship in Japan is a professional golf tournament held at PGM Ishioka Golf Club in Omitama, Japan.

The tournament was inaugurated in 2022, originally as a co-sanctioned European Tour and Japan Golf Tour event. It was to be the first ever European Tour sanctioned event to take place in Japan. 

However, in February 2022, it was announced that the event would proceed as a sole-sanctioned Japan Golf Tour event due to travel restrictions caused by the COVID-19 pandemic. It is intended that the tournament will return to the European Tour schedule in 2023. Due to the rescheduling, the ISPS Handa Championship in Spain was held the same week as a replacement event on the European Tour's 2022 schedule.

Yuto Katsuragawa won the inaugural event, beating Rikuya Hoshino by one shot.

Winners

Notes

References

External links
Coverage on Japan Golf Tour official site

Japan Golf Tour events
Golf tournaments in Japan